The Presles–Courcelles station is a railway station in Presles (Val d'Oise department), France, near the hamlet of Courcelles. It is on the Épinay-Villetaneuse–Le Tréport-Mers railway. The station is used by Transilien line H trains from Paris to Persan-Beaumont. The Nord railway company opened the line from Épinay to Persan–Beaumont in 1877.

References

External links

 

Railway stations in Val-d'Oise
Railway stations in France opened in 1877